Steve Davison is Lead Creative Executive of Parades and Spectaculars for Disney Live Entertainment, and is responsible for the overall creative direction of daytime parades, firework displays, and nighttime spectaculars at Walt Disney Parks and Resorts worldwide. He created such shows as Believe... There's Magic in the Stars, Wishes: A Magical Gathering of Disney Dreams, World of Color, and Disney Dreams!.

Career at Disney
Davison began his career with Disney in 1981 as a model maker for the Disneyland Entertainment Art Department under the supervision of former art department head, Clare Graham. After several years serving as a model maker, art director, and senior art director for the department, he was promoted to show director in 1997, where he began to work on entertainment creative development. In the same year he spawned his first big creation, "It's a Small World Holiday," which brought Davison into the spotlight.

In 1999, Davison was approached to create a new fireworks show for the 45th Anniversary of Disneyland. Though having no prior experience with pyrotechnics, Davison created Believe... There's Magic in the Stars, the second fireworks show made for the park since Fantasy in the Sky debuted in 1958. The show launched his pyrotechnics career. Davison's next attraction conversion was Haunted Mansion Holiday. His idea of "when holidays collide" generated controversy from both Disney management and Haunted Mansion fans, delaying the project's approval by several years. But like It's a Small World Holiday, it quickly became popular among guests after debuting in 2001.

In 2003, Anne Hamburger, former executive vice president of Walt Disney Creative Entertainment, asked Davison to join Imagineering as creative director for parades and shows worldwide, leading to his promotion to vice president, parades and spectaculars, in 2006.

In 2015, Davison was announced at the unveiling of the Disneyland Resort Diamond Celebration under a new job title, lead creative executive of parades and spectaculars.

Works
Productions which Davison was responsible for the creation of include:

Disneyland Resort
World of Color (and related show additions such as, World of Color: Celebrate, World of Color: Winter Dreams, World of Color: Season of Light, and World of Color: Villainous)
Disneyland Forever
 Mickey's Soundsational Parade
 Light Magic (Steve's first job for Art Director in 1997)
 Believe... There's Magic in the Stars
 Believe... In Holiday Magic
 Disney's Eureka! A California Parade
 Disney's LuminAria
 Fantasmic! (updated version which premiered in 2017)
 Haunted Mansion Holiday
 Remember... Dreams Come True
 Walt Disney's Parade of Dreams
 Block Party Bash
 Pixar Play Parade
 Magical: Disney's New Nighttime Spectacular of Magical Celebrations
 Halloween Screams
Paint the Night Parade
 It's a Small World Holiday
Mickey’s Mix Magic

Walt Disney World Resort
 Wishes: A Magical Gathering of Disney Dreams
 Block Party Bash
 Festival of Fantasy Parade
 Once Upon A Time
 Harmonious

Tokyo Disney Resort
 Once Upon A Time
 The Legend of Mythica
 Jubilation!
 Fantasmic! (Tokyo DisneySea Version)
Happiness is Here Parade
Disney Gifts of Christmas
Dreaming Up Parade
Celebrate! Tokyo Disneyland
Believe! Sea of Dreams

Disneyland Paris
 Disney Dreams! (and related show additions such as, Disney Dreams of Christmas!)
 Wishes: A Magical Gathering of Disney Dreams
 Disney Stars on Parade
 Disney Illuminations

Hong Kong Disneyland
 Paint the Night Parade
 Flights of Fantasy Parade
 Mickey's WaterWorks

Shanghai Disneyland
 Ignite the Dream: A Nighttime Spectacular of Magic and Light
 Mickey's Storybook Express
 Voyage to the Crystal Grotto

References

Living people
Year of birth missing (living people)
Walt Disney Parks and Resorts people
Disney executives
Disney imagineers
American designers